Saari, or Nsari, is an Eastern Beboid language of Cameroon. According to Ethnologue, it's 84% lexically similar to Ncane, making it very close to the Noni cluster.

References

Sources
 Blench, Roger, 2011. 'The membership and internal structure of Bantoid and the border with Bantu'. Bantu IV, Humboldt University, Berlin.
Richards, Russell M. 1991. Phonologie de trois langues beboides du Cameroun: Noone, Ncanti et Sari. Thèse pour le doctorat (Arrête du 23 Novembre 1988), Livres I. et II. Université de la Sorbonne Nouvelle Paris III.

Beboid languages
Languages of Cameroon